Bradbery is a surname. Notable people with the surname include:

Danielle Bradbery (born 1996), American country singer
Gordon Bradbery (born 1951), Australian politician and pastor
William Bradbery (1776–1860), English entrepreneur

See also
Bradbury (surname)